Huang Cunguang (born July 29, 1985 in Changle, Fujian) is a Chinese slalom canoeist who has competed at the international level since 2005. At the 2012 Summer Olympics he competed in the K1 event, finishing 17th in the heats, failing to qualify for the semifinals.

World Cup individual podiums

1 Asia Canoe Slalom Championship counting for World Cup points

References

1985 births
Living people
Sportspeople from Fuzhou
Olympic canoeists of China
Canoeists at the 2012 Summer Olympics
Asian Games medalists in canoeing
Canoeists at the 2010 Asian Games
Asian Games gold medalists for China
Chinese male canoeists
Medalists at the 2010 Asian Games
21st-century Chinese people